The 2007 Asian Weightlifting Championships were held at the Taishan College Gymnasium in Tai'an Shandong in PR China between April 17 and April 28 2007. It was the 38th men's and 19th women's championship. The event was organised by the Asian Weightlifting Federation.

Training before the event was done in the Weightlifting Training Hall of the Tai’an Comprehensive Gymnasium, with 20 training platforms.

Medal summary

Men

Women

Medal table 

Ranking by Big (Total result) medals 

Ranking by all medals: Big (Total result) and Small (Snatch and Clean & Jerk)

Participating nations 
130 athletes from 19 nations competed.

 (15)
 (6)
 (1)
 (5)
 (7)
 (8)
 (3)
 (9)
 (4)
 (5)
 (1)
 (4)
 (5)
 (8)
 (5)
 (15)
 (8)
 (8)
 (13)

References
Results

External links
Overview 

2007
Asian Weightlifting Championships
Weightlifting Championships
Asian Weightlifting Championships